Ana Ivanovic was the two-time defending champion, but didn't qualify and was not able to compete as a wildcard due to playing in the Fed Cup.

Second seed Nadia Petrova won the title, defeating top seed Caroline Wozniacki in the final. This was Petrova's 13th and final WTA singles title before announcing her retirement in January 2017 (she played her last tournament in April 2014).

Players

Alternates

Draw
The eight players have been drawn into two groups – "Serdika" and "Sredets" – which are the ancient names of the city of Sofia during the thracian, respectively medieval period of Bulgarian history.

Finals

Serdika group
Standings are determined by: 1. number of wins; 2. number of matches; 3. in two-players-ties, head-to-head records; 4. in three-players-ties, percentage of sets won, or of games won; 5. steering-committee decision.

Sredets group
Standings are determined by: 1. number of wins; 2. number of matches; 3. in two-players-ties, head-to-head records; 4. in three-players-ties, percentage of sets won, or of games won; 5. steering-committee decision.

References

External links
 Main Draw

Qatar Airways Tournament of Champions
WTA Tournament of Champions
Tennis tournaments in Bulgaria
Sports competitions in Sofia
2012 in Bulgarian sport